Golkow may refer to:
Golków, Łódź Voivodeship, Poland
Gołków, Masovian Voivodeship, Poland